The 1990 Local Council meeting was the fifth in the history of the Russian Orthodox Church, the Local Council in the second patriarchal period (since 1917), which took place on 7 and 8 June 1990 at the Trinity Lavra of St. Sergius.

The council elected the 15th Patriarch of Moscow and All Russia, Metropolitan Alexy of Leningrad and Novgorod (Ridiger) and canonized confessors, martyrs and saints, including St. John of Kronstadt. During the council discussed the problem of relations with the Russian Orthodox Church Abroad, combat the activation of the Ukrainian Autocephalous Orthodox Church in western Ukraine and relations with the state.

Background
On the day of the death of Patriarch Pimen, May 3, 1990, a meeting of the Holy Synod was held: according to the "Charter of the Russian Orthodox Church" which was adopted two years earlier, during the 1998 meeting of the local council - Chapter 4, "The Holy Synod at widowhood Patriarchal chair, chaired by Metropolitan of Kiev, elected from among the permanent members of the locum tenens of the Patriarchal Throne. Of 6-permanent members of the Holy Synod by secret ballot in two rounds Locum Tenens was elected Metropolitan of Kiev and Galich Filaret (Denisenko).

May 7 Holy Synod ruled convene from 6 to 10 June of the Local Council for the election of the Patriarch of Moscow and All Russia and the Commission for the preparation of the Council, headed by the Locum Tenens. Synod decided to hold until May 26 diocesan meeting to elect delegates to the Council by the following quota: one cleric and layman from dioceses, and one representative from the monasteries, theological academies and seminaries. All bishops are in the departments, according to the ordinance of the Russian Orthodox Church are members of the Local Council.

Archpriest Vladislav Tcipin, responding to a question about whether the government was trying to influence the cathedral, said: "In the preparatory stage, probably Council for Religious Affairs tried to intervene and influence. We can assume <...> that the election locum tenens <...> was under the influence of some advice, but in time for the election of the Local Council all said that this influence is not existing."

Bishops' Council meeting
June 6 at the Patriarch's residence in the Danilov Monastery opened the Bishops' Council of the Russian Orthodox Church, which was to discuss the program of the Local Council. Council of Bishops elected three candidates to the patriarchal throne and ruled that the Local Council may supplement the number of candidates. Of the 92 bishops of the Russian Orthodox Church Patriarch could be chosen 75: regulations did not allow the election of the bishop under the age of 40 years, as well as the person is not a citizen of the USSR. Each bishop could vote for one, two or three bishops, striking out the rest of the list.

Secret ballot in the first round were elected Metropolitan of Leningrad Alexis (37 votes) and Metropolitan Vladimir of Rostov (34 votes). The second round took place because the Metropolitan of Kiev and Metropolitan Filaret Krutitsy and Kolomna Juvenal (Poyarkov) received an equal number of votes - 25. According to the results of the second round superiority in 1 vote (34 against 33 for the remaining invalid ballots) received Metropolitan Filaret.

Meeting

June 7
June 7 Divine Liturgy at the Holy Trinity Cathedral of St. Sergius Lavra opened the Local Council . Council meetings were held in the Refectory Church of St Sergius, and participated in them 317 delegates: 90 bishops (sickness could not arrive metropolitan Riga Leonid (Polyakov) and Archbishop Seraphim of Zurich ( Rodionov ), 92 cleric, 88 laymen, including 38 women, 39 representatives from monasteries and 8 delegates from religious schools. 40 members of the Council representing foreign diocese of the Russian Church .

At the beginning of the first hour of the day opening remarks said Patriarchal Vicar Filaret, in which he touched upon the unity of the church:

With a greeting on behalf of the Soviet government and on behalf of the Council for Religious Affairs made its chairman Yuri Hristoradnov. Then the presiding Metropolitan Filaret read a report and proposed Cathedral for voting and adoption of the agenda, rules and procedure for the election, which projects just before distributed to delegates, as well as the Bureau, the Secretariat, credentials, editorial and counting commissions.

The report of the patriarchal locum tenens has been said about the need for early entry to the management of the new Patriarch of the Russian Orthodox Church to address the pressing problems was presented the activities of the late Patriarch Pimen, mentioned about the last celebration of the 1000th anniversary of the Baptism of Russia, the glorification of St. John of Kronstadt, the changes occurred after the local council of 1988. He paid special attention the situation of the Church in the western regions of Ukraine, where the world has been broken actions Uniates and "splitters - autocephalists" and condemns the decision of the Council of Bishops of the Russian Orthodox Church Outside of their institution (parallel ROC) church structures in the USSR.

The most important act of the first day of meetings, he was elected Patriarch. Local Council approved the procedure for electing the proposed Council of Bishops:

 Local council secret or open ballot approves the list of three candidates proposed by the Council of Bishops to elect from among the Patriarch of Moscow and All Russia.
 Local Councilis entitled to make this list more names, guided by Ch. 4, § 17, para - and e of the Charter of the Russian Orthodox Church.
 For the inclusion of additional persons in the list of candidates shall be by secret ballot: the ballot made person who received support at least 12 members of the Local Council . Are elected candidates who receive more than 50% of the vote .
 Local Council secret ballot from a list of candidates from one them . 5) elected patriarch considered bishop who receives more than 50% of the vote .
 If none of the candidates receives more than 50% of the vote, in which case a second vote on the two candidates who received the most votes.

In addition to the three candidates from the Council of Bishops at the Local Council have been proposed as candidates names metropolitans Krutitsa Juvenal, Minsk Filaret, Pitirim of Volokolamsk, Stavropol Gideon ( Dokukina ) and Surozh Anthony. Candidacy Metropolitan Anthony presided over the council, Metropolitan Filaret ( Denisenko ) led by recalling that the statute does not allow election Patriarch person without a Soviet citizenship . When the members of the Council suggested that the paragraph of the Charter, it was explained that the newly adopted voting agenda is no such item . [9] By open ballot for four additional proposed candidates revealed that Metropolitan Gideon supported at least 12 people, so the lists were made by secret ballot the names of only three metropolitans. Out of 316 voters supported the Metropolitan Pitirim 128 Cathedral Folk, Metropolitan Filaret - 117 and Metropolitan Juvenal - 106. Became a question as to whether this half of all voters ( 316/2 = 158, and then none of the three did not pass ) or on the number of valid ballots (215 /2 = 107.5, and then to three candidates from the Council of Bishops added two more Metropolitan ) . This nuance was not taken into account, however, the presiding Metropolitan Filaret of Kiev announced that none of the additional nominees did not get half the support members of the Council . [9] Thus, in the list in order to vote were three candidates nominated by the Council of Bishops . [5]

Archbishop Maxim Mogilevsky suggested not to vote for candidates, and the example of the Local Council in 1917 to elect a Patriarch lot. Chairman supported the proposal, but it is met with no sympathy from the Cathedral Folk, was not accepted. Member of the Cathedral, Archbishop Kyril ( later Metropolitan and Patriarch ) in an interview explained the reason for this choice : "Control of power [ in Soviet times ] was hard and, of course , at the time it was unthinkable that the patriarch is elected by secret ... And in 1988 and began a change with changes began sweeping . And at this moment turning in any case could not draw lots . Because it was necessary to the whole council identified himself with this choice. And to His Holiness Patriarch knew conscious support of the church. And it gives a huge primate authority".

In the evening, Chairman of the Counting Commission, Metropolitan Anthony of Sourozh announced the results of the secret ballot: 139 votes were cast for the Metropolitan Alexy of Leningrad and Novgorod, 107 for the Metropolitan of Rostov and Novocherkassk Vladimir and 66 for the Metropolitan Filaret of Kiev and Galich.

At ten o'clock in the evening opened last meeting . In the second round for the Metropolitan Alexy 166 votes, followed by Metropolitan Vladimir - 143 members of the Council, 8 ballots were invalid . At 22 hours 20 minutes, the bell of the Trinity- Sergius Lavra announced the election of Patriarch of All Russia fifteenth.

After the announcement of the final election results, the newly elected patriarch responded to a question addressed to him by the Chairman of the Council laid rank the words "Election I sanctified by the Local Council of the Russian Orthodox Church , Patriarch of Moscow and All Russia, with thanksgiving object and say unto the least contrary." Cathedral then made the act of electing the Patriarch and the cathedral letter, addressed to him . Under that document and others have signed all of the bishops - the members of the Local Council . At the end of the evening session senior by consecration Archbishop Orenburg Russian Church Archbishop Leontius asked the newly elected Patriarch Alexy with compliments: "Force of unity of the Holy Spirit the Local Council of the Russian Orthodox Church elected to the throne of widowhood Patriarch of Moscow and All Russia, your holiness , fifteenth lamp All-Russian Patriarch throne. Rejoice and rejoice and wholeheartedly and sincerely welcome Your Holiness . Patriarchate of Your Holiness blessed be the Russian Orthodox Church and the salvation of your Shrines." In reply, Patriarch Alexy II thanked all members of the Local Council for the election and congratulations and said:

Until almost midnight approached members of the Local Council to elected Patriarch, bringing their congratulations. The first day ended with the singing of the Cathedral thanksgiving. The first rose and other issues which had detailed discussion on the second day.

June 8
June 8 meeting was opened by the new chairman of the Cathedral Metropolitan Alexy was elected Patriarch. At 12:00 a report on the canonization of Archpriest John of Kronstadt by the chairman of the Synodal Commission for Saints Metropolitan Juvenal Krutitsy and Kolomna. Thereon Council published an act of glorification of John of Kronstadt.

Projects conciliar definitions and messages, topical issues of church life (the legal status of the Church, the Church's unity and division in Ukraine, relations with the Orthodox Church) were the subject of lengthy discussions. All performances of the second day anyway concerned themes of unity of the Church. [9] Unusually acute bore performance Archbishop Herman Berlin (Timofeyev), devoted mostly relations of Church and State in the historical as well as in legal terms, and the draft law on freedom of conscience, obublikovannogo June 5.

Legislators appropriated the right to substitute their own notions of the faithful representation of his Church, for example, want to spend hard substitution inherent hierarchical structure of the Church Congregational monolithic her device. This they interfere in the internal life of the church, intentionally want it to distort and this distortion legislate. In conclusion, Archbishop Herman spoke about the persecution suffered by the Church in the Soviet era, and raised the question of the canonization of the New Martyrs. After the speech of Herman Lords heard first at the Council applause. new draft legislation expressed Archbishops Kirill of Smolensk and Kaliningrad, Yaroslavl and Rostov Plato and secondary - Berlin and Leipzig German. [9]. At the end of the day Cathedral voted for the main theses appeal to the Supreme Council and the Council of Ministers, with the three main wishes of the legislator: the recognition of the legal rights for the Church as a whole, not just for its communities, providing the right to teach religious subjects in schools (optional), the recognition Church for ownership of church buildings and other property, which at that time only rented.

Much attention has been paid to the relationship with the Russian Orthodox Church. The first time this issue has raised June 7, one delegate laymen offered to meet three requirements of the Russian Orthodox Church - the canonization of martyrs and confessors of the Cathedral of Russian condemnation declaration of Metropolitan Sergius (Stragorodsky) from 1927; rejection of ecumenism. Relations with the ROCOR Metropolitans were devoted to presentations Krutitsa Juvenal, Vienna Irenaeus (Zuzemilya), Archbishops Kirill of Smolensk, Saratov Pimen (Khmelevskiy), Yaroslavl Plato, Archpriest Basil Stoyanova priest Vitaly Shastina, Hieromonk Hilarion (Alfeyev) and others.

General condemnation caused by the decision of the Synod of the Russian Orthodox Church on May 16 on the establishment of parishes and their hierarchy in the territory of the Russian Orthodox Church. Participants Council qualified the decision as directed by sowing confusion and a new division, and stressed that it will encourage the emergence of conflicts such as Suzdal, where Archimandrite Valentin (Rusantsov), which entered into conflict with the canonical bishop, announced its move into the jurisdiction of the ROCA. Archbishop Plato suggested to address a pastoral word to all Orthodox Russian people in a jurisdiction "Karlovci Church" to "somehow enlighten them." In conclusion made by Archbishop Kirill of Smolensk.

1990 in Christianity
1990 in the Soviet Union
20th-century Eastern Orthodoxy
Eastern Orthodoxy in the Soviet Union
History of the Russian Orthodox Church
1990 conferences